Andrea Benetti (born 28 June 1980 in Turin) is an Italian slalom canoeist who competed at the international level from 1997 to 2013.

He won a bronze medal in the C2 event at the 2007 ICF Canoe Slalom World Championships in Foz do Iguaçu and again at the 2008 European Championships in Kraków.

Benetti also competed in two Summer Olympics, earning his best finish of fifth in the C2 event in Beijing in 2008.

His partner in the C2 boat for most of his career was Erik Masoero.

World Cup individual podiums

References

42-83 from Medal Winners ICF updated 2007.pdf?MenuID=Results/1107/0,Medal_winners_since_1936/1510/0 ICF medalists for Olympic and World Championships - Part 2: rest of flatwater (now sprint) and remaining canoeing disciplines: 1936-2007.

1980 births
Canoeists at the 2004 Summer Olympics
Canoeists at the 2008 Summer Olympics
Italian male canoeists
Living people
Olympic canoeists of Italy
Medalists at the ICF Canoe Slalom World Championships
21st-century Italian people